Red Army Standard Ammunition is a trademark associated with Century International Arms (CIA), an arms and ammunition corporation in Delray Beach, Florida, United States. The official spelling of the brand's name is faux Cyrillic, written as RЭD АRMY STAИDARD. The company supplies various sizes of cartridges for designs of firearms, such as the AKM and AK-47 rifles and the Makarov PM pistol, originating from Russia and former Soviet (Eastern Bloc) countries. Cartridges are made in various countries, including Russia, Ukraine, Romania, Bosnia and Herzegovina, and Poland. One manufacturer of RAS cartridges is Lugansk Cartridge Works, in Lugansk, Ukraine and its headstamp code is the letters "". Another factory is the IGMAN d.d. Konjic cartridge plant in the city of Konjic, in Igman, Bosnia and Herzegovina and its newer headstamp is the letters "", while the older headstamp consists of the Cyrillic letters "".

Ammunition products 

 7.62×25mm Tokarev 86-grain lead core, bi-metal copper-steel full metal jacket bullet, polymer coated steel case, non-corrosive, berdan primed 
 9×18mm Makarov 94 grain lead core, bi-metal copper-steel full metal jacket bullet, polymer coated steel case, non-corrosive, berdan primed
 9×18mm Makarov ELITE 93 grain lead core, copper full metal jacket bullet with concave exposed lead base, brass case, non-corrosive, boxer primed
 5.45×39mm lead core, bi-metal copper-steel full metal jacket bullet, polymer coated steel case, non-corrosive, berdan primed
 7.62×39mm lead core, bi-metal copper-steel full metal jacket bullet, polymer coated steel case, non-corrosive, berdan primed
 7.62×39mm HP lead core, bi-metal copper-steel hollow point bullet, polymer coated steel case, non-corrosive, berdan primed
 7.62×39mm ELITE lead core, copper full metal jacket bullet, brass case, non-corrosive, boxer primed
 7.62×54mmR lead core, bi-metal copper-steel full metal jacket bullet, polymer-coated steel case, non-corrosive, berdan primed. Note: Around summer 2013, some lots of this cartridge caliber from Romania contained corrosive components, thus the firearm needed to be thoroughly cleaned after each firing session.

Technical details
Known ballistics of R.A.S. ammunition products are below. Some figures are calculated from inputs of other figures such as the energy measured in foot-pounds (ft-lbf). OAL stands for Overall Length.

Data for a Red Army Standard 9×18mm Makarov cartridge, labeled as 94 grain FMJ:

Data for a Red Army Standard 7.62×39mm cartridge with a steel case, labeled as 123 grain FMJ:

Data for a Red Army Standard 7.62×39mm ELITE cartridge with a brass case and copper-lead bullet, labeled as 123 grain FMJ ELITE:

Data for a Red Army Standard 5.45×39mm cartridge with a steel case, labeled as 69 grain FMJ:

Data for a Red Army Standard 7.62×25mm Tokarev cartridge with a steel case, labeled as 86 grain FMJ:

See also 
9×18mm Makarov
Wolf Ammunition
Barnaul Ammunition
Ballistics
2014 Ukrainian Revolution
Tula Arms Plant
Mesko, Arms plant in Poland
List of military headstamps
List of modern armament manufacturers

References

External links 
 Red Army Standard
 Century International Arms
 Barnaul Cartridge Plant (English)
 LUGANSK CARTRIDGE WORKS
 Makarov Technical Information (pistol and ammunition)

Ammunition
Ammunition manufacturers
Defence companies of Ukraine
Companies based in Palm Beach County, Florida
Distribution companies of the United States
Defense companies of the United States